State Route 228 (SR 228) is a  long east-west state highway located entirely in the mountains of northern Wayne County, Tennessee.

Route description

SR 228 begins in Clifton at an intersection with SR 128 northeast of downtown and just north Hassell-Carroll Field Airport. It goes east as Morrison Creek Road to wind its way through mountains to leave Clifton and come to an intersection with Beech Creek Road, where SR 228 makes a sharp right turn to follow that road. The highway then traverses a narrow valley for several miles, where it passes through the community of Leatherwood. SR 228 then turns northeast and makes a very steep ascent up a mountain before coming to an end at an intersection with SR 13 between Waynesboro and Linden. The entire route of SR 228 is a two-lane highway and lies entirely on the Highland Rim.

Major intersections

References

228
Transportation in Wayne County, Tennessee